New Zealand at the 1968 Summer Olympics was represented by a team of 52 competitors, 47 men and five women, who took part in 26 events across eight sports. Selection of the team for the Games in Mexico City, Mexico, was the responsibility of the New Zealand Olympic and British Commonwealth Games Association. New Zealand's flagbearer at the opening ceremony was Don Oliver. The New Zealand team finished 27th on the medal table, winning a total of three medals, one of which was gold.

Medal tables

Athletics

Track and road

Field

Cycling

Five cyclists represented New Zealand in 1968.

Road
Men's individual road race

Men's team time trial

Field hockey

Men's tournament
Team roster

Group A

5th–8th Classification matches

7th / 8th Place play-off

New Zealand finished the men's field hockey tournament in seventh place.

Rowing

In 1968, New Zealand entered boats in two of the seven events: men's coxed four and men's coxed eight. The competition was for men only; women would first row at the 1976 Summer Olympics.

Sailing

Graham Mander was the reserve Flying Dutchman skipper.

Shooting

Two male shooters represented New Zealand in 1968 with Ian Ballinger winning a bronze medal.

Swimming

Weightlifting

Officials
 Chef de Mission – Lloyd Hosking
 Assistant team manager – Don Croot
 Team doctor – Mayne Smeeton
 Chaperone – Norma Williams
 Athletics section manager – Laurie O'Keefe
 Cycling section manager – Clive Herbert
 Hockey section manager – Ray Mackinlay
 Rowing coach – Rusty Robertson
 Sailing section manager – Hugh Poole
 Shooting section manager – Neilson Rees
 Swimming section manager – Roly Webb
 Weightlifting section manager – Paul Newberry

References

External links

Nations at the 1968 Summer Olympics
1968
Summer Olympics